Malcolm Xavier Hamilton (born December 31, 1972) is a former American football linebacker of the National Football League for the Washington Redskins and Atlanta Falcons (practice squad). He also played XFL football for the Birmingham Bolts and in the Arena Football League for the New Jersey Gladiators and Los Angeles Avengers. He played college football at Baylor University and high school football at Odessa Permian High School, captured in the movie and TV series Friday Night Lights.

1972 births
Living people
People from Dallas
American football linebackers
Baylor Bears football players
Washington Redskins players
Birmingham Thunderbolts players